Pikes Creek is a rural locality in the Southern Downs Region, Queensland, Australia.

History 
The locality was named after a pastoral run, transferred to Captain John Pike in 1852 along with Terica.

Pike Creek State School opened on 21 May 1973 and closed on 10 December 1976.

Road infrastructure
The Stanthorpe – Texas Road runs through from north to south-west.

References 

Southern Downs Region
Localities in Queensland